Eremophanes annulicornis is a species of beetle in the family Cerambycidae, and the only species in the genus Eremophanes. It was described by Kolbe in 1894.

References

Apomecynini
Beetles described in 1894
Monotypic Cerambycidae genera